K. Vanlalvena (born 14 January 1970) is an Indian politician and a Member of Parliament at the Rajya Sabha from Mizoram. He belongs to the Mizo National Front backed by the National Democratic Alliance.

Education
He completed his Bachelor's in Science at Pachhunga University College in 1993.

Career
He was the former President of the  Mizo Zirlai Pawl, a student union in Mizoram. He joined politics in 2002 as general secretary of MNF youth wing and later as president of the Youth wing of Mizo National Front. He had previously lost in a bypoll held in Aizawl North-3 in November 2015. He is also currently a member of the National Core Committee of Mizo National Front.

Personal life
He is married to H. Lalhuapzauvi and has 3 children.

See also
List of Rajya Sabha members from Mizoram

References

Mizo National Front politicians
Living people
1970 births
People from Serchhip district
Rajya Sabha members from Mizoram
Mizo people